

The Hundred of Moule is a cadastral hundred of South Australia established in 1889 in the remote County of Way. Now bisected by the Eyre Highway, the traditional owners of the area are the Waringu people.

References

Moule